Melchor de Marchena (19071980; born Melchor Jimenez Torres) was a Spanish flamenco guitarist. Born in Marchena, Spain, he is considered to be one of the most representative artists with a "gypsy touch", along with Diego del Gastor. His love of flamenco comes from a family environment. His father, "El Lico" was a  guitarist in his own right, while his mother "La Josefita", was a singer, as was one of his aunts, artistically known as "La Gilica de Marchena", who sang Soleá. Two of his brothers, Chicho Melchor and Miguel el Bizco, were also guitarists, like his son Enrique de Melchor (1950–2012), who continued the family tradition. Playing the guitar, Melchor accompanied several singers of his time, such  as Manolo Caracol, La Niña de los Peines, and Antonio Mairena. In 1966, he was awarded the National Prize Flamenco Guitar, the highest award of its kind. In 1974 he performed with Paco de Lucia at the flamenco festival of La Union on the coast of eastern Spain. He died in Madrid in 1980.

References

1907 births
1980 deaths
Spanish flamenco guitarists
Spanish male guitarists
People from Campiña de Morón y Marchena
Musicians from Andalusia
20th-century Spanish musicians
Flamenco guitarists
20th-century guitarists
20th-century Spanish male musicians